Douglas County Courthouse may refer to:

 Douglas County Courthouse (Georgia), Douglasville, Georgia
 Douglas County Courthouse (Illinois), Tuscola, Illinois
 Douglas County Courthouse (Kansas), Lawrence, Kansas
 Douglas County Courthouse (Minnesota), Alexandria, Minnesota, listed on the National Register of Historic Places
 Douglas County Courthouse (Nebraska), Omaha, Nebraska
 Douglas County Courthouse (Nevada), Minden, Nevada
 Douglas County Courthouse (South Dakota), Armour, South Dakota
 Douglas County Courthouse (Washington), Waterville, Washington
 Douglas County Courthouse (Wisconsin), Superior, Wisconsin